Kevin station, in Kevin, Montana, was built by the Great Northern Railroad in Kevin, Montana in 1903.  It was listed on the National Register of Historic Places in 1980 as the Kevin Depot.

It was deemed to be "architecturally significant because it is typical of small town stations of turn-of-the-century Montana. The Great Northern Railroad created the Kevin site for steam locomotives to take on water half-way on their journey from the high-line to the Canadian border. Rainwater was collected in a pit behind the station. These small stations have all but disappeared; Kevin is one of the few left."

It is a  structure with a square bay on one side and an addition built in 1925.  It was moved two blocks from its railroad right-of-way location in 1979, with intention that the moved building would be used as a senior citizens center.

References

Railway stations on the National Register of Historic Places in Montana
Railway stations in the United States opened in 1903
National Register of Historic Places in Toole County, Montana
Former Great Northern Railway (U.S.) stations
1903 establishments in Montana
Former railway stations in Montana
Transportation in Toole County, Montana